Harold Eugene Reniff (July 2, 1938 – September 7, 2004) was an American professional baseball player. He was born in Warren, Ohio, and signed with the Yankees in 1956 after graduating from Chaffey High School in Ontario, California.

Reniff spent five full years in minor league baseball (winning 21 games for the Modesto Reds of the Class C California League in 1959) before he was called up to the Yankees in June . That season, the best of his career, he recorded a career-high 18 saves (sixth in the American League) and posted his finest earned run average (2.62). He pitched in the 1963 and 1964 World Series for the Yankees, allowing two hits and a base on balls, but no runs in 3 total innings pitched. He did not get credit for a decision or a save, as the Yankees fell in both Fall Classics, to the Los Angeles Dodgers and St. Louis Cardinals respectively.

The Yankees sold Reniff's contract to the crosstown New York Mets in June 1967, and he completed his major league career on the Mets' bullpen staff, getting into 29 games. Returning to the Yankee organization in 1968, he spent five full years at Triple-A Syracuse, but did not earn a recall to the majors. He retired after the 1972 season, his 17th in pro ball, at age 34.  He died in the city of Ontario, aged 66, in 2004.

Career MLB statistics

 276 games pitched (all in relief)
 21 wins
 23 losses
 45 saves
 314 strikeouts
 242 bases on balls
 383 hits allowed
 471 innings pitched
 3.27 earned run average

References

External links

 

1938 births
2004 deaths
Amarillo Gold Sox players
Baseball players from Ohio
Binghamton Triplets players
Greensboro Yankees players
Kearney Yankees players
Major League Baseball pitchers
Modesto Reds players
New York Mets players
New York Yankees players
People from Ontario, California
Richmond Virginians (minor league) players
Salem Senators players
Syracuse Chiefs players